This is a list of seasons completed by the Seton Hall Pirates men's college basketball team.

Seasons

Notes

Seton Hall Pirates
Seton Hall Pirates men's basketball seasons
Seton Hall Pirates basketball seasons